Saturday Night Live is an American sketch comedy series created and produced by Lorne Michaels for most of the show's run. The show has aired on NBC since 1975.

The 1990–91 season brought the first major changes to the show's cast in over four years, adding cast members such as Chris Farley and David Spade. 

With most of the older cast gone, Michaels attempt to push a mix of old (Kevin Nealon, Mike Myers) and new (Janeane Garofalo, Michael McKean) for the 1994–95 season's cast. This season is widely considered as one of the show's worst (along with the 1980–81 and 1985–86 seasons). After this cast, Michaels replaced most of the cast with unknowns for the 1995–96 season, once again saving the show from cancellation.

Transition in progress (1990–1991)
The 1990–91 season was a transitional year. Jon Lovitz and Nora Dunn left the show after the previous season, the latter in a cloud of controversy. Lorne Michaels introduced a number of players who quickly became stars on the show: Chris Farley, Tim Meadows, Chris Rock, Adam Sandler, Rob Schneider, David Spade, and Julia Sweeney.

Memorable characters and sketches introduced by the new cast members from this period included Sweeney's "Pat," Sandler's "Opera Man" and "Canteen Boy," Farley's "Matt Foley," Schneider's annoying office geek "The Copy Guy," Rock's black perspective talk show host "Nat X," and Spade's caustic commentary piece "Hollywood Minute." The popularity of these new cast members helped to offset the departure of several popular long-time players over the first two seasons of this era, including Jan Hooks and "Weekend Update" anchor Dennis Miller after this season, as well as Victoria Jackson after the following season.

The remaining cast members of the "older" cast (Dana Carvey, Phil Hartman, Mike Myers and Kevin Nealon) also remained popular with audiences. Nealon succeeded Miller as "Weekend Update" anchor. For the remainder of his tenure, Nealon found himself playing the straight man during "Update" and other sketches, particularly against the newer cast members. His participation in that role increased after Carvey, Hartman, and Myers left the show. Myers introduced many popular new characters during this period, including Linda Richman, host of the fictional talk show "Coffee Talk." Meanwhile, Hartman, who had impersonated President Ronald Reagan on the show, began appearing regularly with his impression of Democratic candidate and soon-to-be President Bill Clinton. Carvey continued to perform his impersonation of President George H. W. Bush while also developing an impression of independent presidential candidate Ross Perot. In the period leading up to the 1992 presidential election, Carvey and Hartman dominated the show with their impressions, creating mock debates. The Myers and Carvey characters Wayne Campbell and Garth Algar from the "Wayne's World" sketch would become household names during the early 1990s following the release of the successful feature film, Wayne's World. The new additions in 1990 included Adam Sandler, Chris Farley, Rob Schneider, David Spade, and Chris Rock. This group would come to be known as the Bad Boys of SNL, and remained fairly close in the years after they left the show. Each have appeared in movies with the others, with the partnership between Sandler and Schneider being the most notable.

Season Breakdown
Of the new cast members of the show, Chris Farley was not afraid to trade on his size for laughs. In one sketch, "Chippendales Audition," he played a shirtless dancer, opposite the trim and muscular Dirty Dancing star Patrick Swayze, as they competed in an audition for a position with the Chippendales male dance troupe. Sandler and Farley also did a song called "Lunch Lady Land," with Farley dancing while dressed up as a lunch lady. Another recurring Farley character was the manic, thrice-divorced motivational speaker Matt Foley, whose schtick consisted mainly of yelling at and whining to his clients about having to live "in a van down by the river," and hurling himself around the room, demolishing everything in sight. Farley was fired from the show in 1995, but went on to star in successful movies like Tommy Boy and Black Sheep with David Spade, and Beverly Hills Ninja with Chris Rock and Nicollette Sheridan.

Season breakdown

1990–1991 season

Cast
 Dana Carvey
 Phil Hartman
 Jan Hooks
 Victoria Jackson
 Dennis Miller
 Mike Myers
 Kevin Nealon
With
 Chris Farley
 Tim Meadows (debut: February 9, 1991)
 Chris Rock
 Julia Sweeney (debut: November 10, 1990)
Featuring
 A. Whitney Brown (final: March 16, 1991)
 Al Franken
 Adam Sandler (debut: February 9, 1991)
 Rob Schneider (debut: October 27, 1990)
 David Spade    (debut: November 10, 1990)

1991–1992 season

Cast
 Dana Carvey
 Chris Farley
 Phil Hartman
 Victoria Jackson
 Mike Myers
 Kevin Nealon
 Chris Rock
 Julia Sweeney
With
 Ellen Cleghorne
 Siobhan Fallon
 Tim Meadows
 Adam Sandler
 Rob Schneider
 David Spade
Featuring
 Beth Cahill (debut: November 16, 1991)
 Al Franken
 Melanie Hutsell (debut: November 16, 1991)
 Robert Smigel

1992–1993 season

On October 3, at the end of her second song, a cover of Bob Marley's song "War," musical guest Sinéad O'Connor created controversy by holding up a picture of Pope John Paul II, exclaiming, "Fight the real enemy," and tearing the picture to pieces. According to the book Live From New York, this was unrehearsed. The act was condemned by Michaels and the SNL crew, who refused to light the applause sign after O'Connor's performance; likewise, guest host Tim Robbins, who was raised Catholic, did not thank O'Connor during the closing.

Cast
 Dana Carvey (final episode: February 6, 1993)
 Chris Farley
 Phil Hartman
 Mike Myers
 Kevin Nealon
 Chris Rock
 Rob Schneider
 Julia Sweeney
Featuring
 Ellen Cleghorne
 Melanie Hutsell
 Tim Meadows
 Adam Sandler
 David Spade
With
 Al Franken
 Robert Smigel

1993–1994 season

After the end of the 1993–1994 season, having already lost star cast member Dana Carvey, who left midway through the previous season, SNL's 1994 post-season saw more departures. Julia Sweeney left due to frustration and burnout. Another departure was that of Phil Hartman, whose final moment on the show was at the end of a musical number, with the entire cast singing a parody of the "So Long, Farewell" song from The Sound of Music. After all of the cast had left the stage, Farley, appearing as his Matt Foley character, was left sitting on the stage, with Phil walking back on stage, cuddling next to Farley to sing goodbye and waving at the audience.

Producer Lorne Michaels hired a number of new cast members, beginning midway through the 1993–1994 season.

Cast
 Ellen Cleghorne
 Chris Farley
 Phil Hartman
 Melanie Hutsell
 Michael McKean (debut: March 12, 1994)
 Tim Meadows
 Mike Myers
 Kevin Nealon
 Adam Sandler
 Rob Schneider
 David Spade
 Julia Sweeney
Featuring
 Al Franken
 Norm Macdonald (debut: October 2, 1993)
 Jay Mohr (debut: October 9, 1993)
 Sarah Silverman (debut: October 9, 1993)

1994–1995 season

Similar to his decision in the mid-1980s to bring in established actors Randy Quaid, Joan Cusack and Robert Downey, Jr., Michaels added Michael McKean, and later Chris Elliott, to the cast. Both left at the end of the 1994–1995 season.

Later acquisitions were sketch veteran Mark McKinney of the recently wrapped, Michaels-produced Canadian sketch comedy show The Kids in the Hall, and stand-up comic Janeane Garofalo, the latter of whom joined at the beginning of the 1994–1995 season, and the former joining in January shortly before the departure of Mike Myers. Garofalo left in mid-season, replaced by Molly Shannon. Myers also left in mid-season, as would Nealon after the season's end. Farley and Sandler left at the end of the season. Longtime featured player Jay Mohr left as well, and Al Franken, who had worked on the show as a writer and featured player on and off since 1975, also departed later that season. British actress Morwenna Banks joined the cast for the last four episodes of the season as a full cast member.

Much like season 6 [1980-1981] (or, to a lesser extent, season 11 [1985-1986]), season 20 [1994-1995] is considered one of SNL'''s worst-received seasons. The season was home to many cast turnovers and much dissension. Janeane Garofalo left the show halfway through the season. Mike Myers departed to pursue a movie career. Longtime feature player Al Franken quit; Ellen Cleghorne, Kevin Nealon, Chris Elliott, and Michael McKean also quit the show as well. Laura Kightlinger left to join Roseanne Barr's ill-fated FOX comedy series Saturday Night Special. Morwenna Banks, Chris Farley, Jay Mohr, and Adam Sandler were fired. Banks was hired as a contract player for the last four episodes of the season, but did not return for Season 21.

Towards the end of the 1994–1995 season on SNL the show was in a state of turmoil, with the show enacting the highest turnover rate going into the next season. The 1994–1995 season had a total of 14 cast members; only five remained for the 1995–1996 season: Molly Shannon, Mark McKinney, Norm Macdonald, David Spade and Tim Meadows.

Cast
 Morwenna Banks (debut: April 8, 1995)
 Ellen Cleghorne
 Chris Elliott
 Chris Farley
 Janeane Garofalo (final: February 25, 1995)
 Norm Macdonald
 Michael McKean
 Mark McKinney (debut: January 14, 1995)
 Tim Meadows
 Mike Myers (final episode: January 21, 1995)
 Kevin Nealon
 Adam Sandler
 David SpadeFeaturing''
 Al Franken (final: May 6, 1995)
 Laura Kightlinger
 Jay Mohr
 Molly Shannon (debut: February 25, 1995)

References

1990
Saturday Night Live history 1990
1990s in American television